Michael Billwein (born 15 December 1963) is an Austrian modern pentathlete. He competed at the 1984 Summer Olympics.

References

External links
 

1963 births
Living people
Austrian male modern pentathletes
Olympic modern pentathletes of Austria
Modern pentathletes at the 1984 Summer Olympics